Giorgi Daraselia (born 17 September 1968 in Senaki) is a Georgian-Israeli (since 2010) association football coach and former international player.

Career

International goals

Coach
After finishing his playing career in 2004, Giorgi Daraselia became an assistant coach at Hapoel Kfar Saba. He, along with Elisha Levy, in different Israeli clubs worked until September 2012. They twice (2008–2009, 2010–2011) led Maccabi Haifa to the league title.

Giorgi Daraselia passed the coaching requirement courses in the Israel Football Association, and in Spring 2010, received the PRO Category License which allows him to coach professional teams.

Daraselia received his 1st  chance as a head coach in Georgia იn September 2012 with Dila Gori of Georgian Highest League (Umaglesi Liga), and led the team from last to second place while winning 16 out of 18 games. During that season, Daraselia became the only coach in Georigia's football history who was able to defeat each of the 11 members of the Umaglesi Liga in a span that lasted from September 15, 2012 to November 18, 2012.  

In January 2013, Giorgi Daraselia became the head coach of Football Championship of the National League team of Russia - SKA-Energiya Khabarovsk. 

After several years spent at different clubs, in June 2021 he was appointed as a manager of Sioni Bolnisi, which competed in the Georgian second division. Under his guidance the team gained automatic promotion, but after three top-flight games they parted ways upon mutual consent. Since April 2022 he has been head coach of Liga 2 side Shevardeni-1906.

References

External links

1968 births
Living people
Soviet footballers
Footballers from Georgia (country)
Football managers from Georgia (country)
Expatriate footballers from Georgia (country)
Georgia (country) international footballers
FC Dinamo Tbilisi players
Hapoel Tel Aviv F.C. players
Hapoel Tzafririm Holon F.C. players
Hapoel Kfar Saba F.C. players
Erovnuli Liga players
FC SKA-Khabarovsk managers
FC Dila Gori managers
FC Zugdidi managers
FC Samtredia managers
Bnei Sakhnin F.C. managers
Association football midfielders
Israeli people of Georgian descent
Expatriate football managers in Russia